Stuart Leslie Goddard, better known as Adam Ant (born 3 November 1954), is an English singer, musician, and actor. He gained popularity as the lead singer of new wave group Adam and the Ants and later as a solo artist, scoring 10 UK top ten hits from 1980 to 1983, including three UK No. 1 singles. He has also worked as an actor, appearing in many films and television episodes.

Ant began his musical career playing bass in the band Bazooka Joe. From 1977 to 1982 he performed with Adam and the Ants. Their debut album Dirk Wears White Sox (1979) reached number one on the UK Independent Albums Chart. Prior to recording his second album as Adam and the Ants, he asked producer Malcolm McLaren to manage his band; McLaren instead take his backing band to form Bow Wow Wow. Ant regrouped with new members, including Marco Pirroni, to release his second album Kings of the Wild Frontier (1980). It reached number one in the UK Album Chart, spawned three hit singles, became the UK number-one selling album in 1981, and won Best British Album at the 1982 Brit Awards. He released his third and final album with the group, Prince Charming (1981), which spawned two UK number-one singles "Stand and Deliver" and "Prince Charming".

In 1982, he began a solo career, retaining Marco Pirroni as co-songwriter. His first solo album was Friend or Foe (1982), from which the debut single "Goody Two Shoes" reached number one in the UK and Australia in 1982, and became his first top-20 hit in the United States. The album reached number five on the UK Albums Chart and number 16 on the US Billboard Album Chart, becoming his most successful solo album. His next two solo albums Strip (1983) and Vive Le Rock (1985) were less commercially successful. Ant began to focus on an acting career, performing on stage and in film and television roles throughout the 1980s and 1990s. He released his fourth solo album Manners & Physique (1990) which was produced by André Cymone and featured a Minneapolis sound. Despite the US Top-20 success of the single "Room at the Top", Ant was dropped from MCA Records, and his album Persuasion (1991) was shelved and never officially released. He signed with Capitol Records to release Wonderful (1995). The single "Wonderful" became Ant's third US Top-40 hit single.

Since 2010, Ant has continued his music career, recording and releasing a new album Adam Ant Is the Blueblack Hussar in Marrying the Gunner's Daughter (2013, UK number 25), and completing eight full-length UK national tours, five US national tours, and two Australian tours. A further album, Bravest of the Brave, was recorded in 2014 and is still awaiting release.

Early life
Stuart Goddard was born in Marylebone, London, the only child of Leslie Alfred Goddard and Betty Kathleen Smith. His father had served in the Royal Air Force and worked as a chauffeur, and his mother was an embroiderer for Norman Hartnell. His home was two rooms in the De Walden buildings, St John's Wood. He recalls: "There was no luxury, but there was always food on the table." He is of partial Romani descent; his maternal grandfather, Walter Albany Smith, was Romanichal. This heritage became a basis for a theme in his later work: a concern for oppressed minorities.

His parents divorced when Goddard was seven years old and his mother supported him by working as a domestic cleaner, being briefly employed by Paul McCartney. Goddard's first school was Robinsfield Infants School, where he created a considerable stir by throwing a brick through the head-teacher's office window on two consecutive days. In the aftermath of this incident, Goddard was placed under the supervision of teacher Joanna Saloman, who encouraged him to develop his abilities in art and whom he later credited as the first person to show him he could be creative.

Goddard then attended Barrow Hill Junior School where he boxed and was a member of the cricket team. He passed the eleven plus exam to gain a place at St Marylebone Grammar School, an all-boys school, where he enjoyed history, played rugby, and became a school prefect. After passing six O levels and three A levels, in English, History and Art, Goddard attended  Hornsey College of Art to study graphic design, and was a student of art historian Peter Webb for a time. He dropped out of Hornsey, short of completing his BA, to focus on a career in music.

Early musical career
The first band Goddard joined was Bazooka Joe, in which he played bass guitar. He has said that the idea of Adam Ant came to him after watching the Sex Pistols play their first gig in 1975: "After seeing the Pistols, I wanted to do something different, be someone else, but couldn't work out what and who".: 92, 94 

He renamed himself Adam Ant, choosing the name because "I really knew I wanted to be Adam, because Adam was the first man. Ant I chose because, if there's a nuclear explosion, the ants will survive". He formed his own band, the B-Sides, with Lester Square and Andy Warren.: 94 In 1977, together with drummer Paul Flanagan, they went on to form Adam and the Ants (initially named just "The Ants"), with the inaugural band meeting held in the audience at a Siouxsie and the Banshees performance at the Roxy Club in London's Covent Garden.

Musical career

1977–1982: Adam and the Ants

Adam and the Ants started as part of the burgeoning punk rock movement.  Ant later acted in Derek Jarman's seminal "punk" film Jubilee in 1977, as Adam and the Ants were beginning to gig around London with manager Jordan from the SEX Boutique on Kings Road. His debut as a recording artist was the song "Deutscher Girls", which featured on the film's soundtrack, along with "Plastic Surgery" which was performed in the film. "Deutscher Girls"/"Plastic Surgery" was re-released as a single in 1982. The band toured extensively around the UK but proved to be unpopular with much of the British music press who disliked their fetishistic lyrics and imagery.  Late 1979 saw the release of their début album Dirk Wears White Sox (1979, Do It Records), with Matthew Ashman on guitar, Andy Warren on bass and Dave Barbarossa on drums.

Ant approached Malcolm McLaren (the manager of the Sex Pistols) and asked him to manage the band. McLaren subsequently took the rest of the Ants from the original group when he introduced the singer Annabella Lwin and began the process of honing Bow Wow Wow for chart success. Later Ant seemed to have reconciled with the fact. "I like to use the word 'mutiny'. My band was happy to go. Malcolm tried to see if I could fit into Bow Wow Wow, but I never could've or would've. I might have had a broken heart at the time, but Malcolm didn't leave me with nothing.  He mentored me. He said: 'Look, what do you want?' I said: 'I wanna sell millions of records', and he said, 'Well, you're going the wrong way about it. This [debut album Dirk Wears White Sox] is the kind of esoteric stuff you do when you've done eight albums, you're living on a yacht, and you can do what you want'," he remembered later.

A new version of Adam and the Ants was formed with Marco Pirroni (guitar), Kevin Mooney (bass guitar), and two drummers, Terry Lee Miall and Chris Hughes (ex-Dalek I Love You), who used the name "Merrick". The band signed a major label deal with CBS Records and recorded Kings of the Wild Frontier during the summer of 1980. The album was an enormous hit in the United Kingdom, and the "Antmania" that ensued put the band at the forefront of the New Romantic movement. The single "Antmusic" went to No. 2 on the UK singles chart by December 1980, but made it to No. 1 in the charts in Australia. Following the abrupt departure of Mooney in February 1981, bassist Gary Tibbs, formerly of Roxy Music, joined the band.

In November 1981, Adam & the Ants released another highly successful album, Prince Charming. The album featured two United Kingdom No. 1 singles – "Stand and Deliver" and the title track, "Prince Charming" – as well as the No. 3 UK hit "Ant Rap". This trio of singles was promoted by some of the most lavish music videos of the period and paved the way for Ant's later acting career. The work schedule Ant imposed upon himself was punishing. "I took no holidays – and I mean no holidays. When Kings of the Wild Frontier took off, I was halfway through making Prince Charming, and so on, because we had to bring out an album and four singles a year. But the price you pay... I split my cartilage in Cleveland doing "Goody Two Shoes", it was my body saying, 'Look, no!' Then I was back onstage doing the Motown 25 [in 1983] show 10 days later, having had the operation. Nobody could have stopped me, or make me do it. I did it. I was very, very bad at pacing," he later remembered.

In March 1982, feeling certain band members "lacked enthusiasm" Ant disbanded the group.

1982–2001: Solo career

A few months after Adam and the Ants split, Ant launched his solo career and retained Pirroni as guitarist and co-songwriter. Merrick also briefly stayed as drummer and producer for the UK edition of the first solo hit single "Goody Two Shoes"—which made it to No. 1 in the UK—and demos for the upcoming Friend or Foe album, before moving on to other production work. The Friend or Foe album also produced another top ten single, "Friend or Foe", which reached No. 9 in September 1982.

Ant recruited a new band for touring, consisting of new dual drummers Bogdan Wiczling (ex-Fingerprintz) and Barry Watts (ex-Q-Tips), plus guitarist Cha Burns (also ex-Fingerprintz), bassist Chris Constantinou and the former Q-Tips brass section of trumpeter Tony Hughes and twin saxophonists Stewart van Blandamer and Steve Farr. The new band made its debut at London's Astoria Theatre on 1 October 1982. A US tour began in New York on 8 November. On the 19th tour date on 20 February 1983 in Cleveland, Ohio, Ant suffered a knee injury onstage (a relapse of a previous injury suffered while filming Jubilee in 1977), forcing the postponement and/or cancellation of dates throughout February and March while he recuperated.  Ant eventually returned to performing, performing as a guest on the NBC''' show Motown 25: Yesterday, Today, Forever, joined onstage by Diana Ross. He resumed the US tour, completed on 18 May 1983 at the Bronco Bowl in Dallas, Texas.

During his recuperation from the knee injury, Ant worked with Pirroni on new material that formed the basis of Ant's second solo album, Strip. With promotion on the Strip album complete, Ant reduced his band to the quartet of himself, Pirroni (now out of retirement again), Wiczling and Constantinou. The latter two adopted the stage names Count Wiczling and Chris De Niro respectively and were upgraded from live backing musicians to being full-time band members, featured on record sleeves, logos and even in song lyrics. The LP Strip produced a top ten single, "Puss'n Boots", that reached No. 5 in the UK charts in October 1983. Ant formally unveiled his new four-piece band at the 1984 Montreux Pop Festival,

In July 1985, Ant secured a spot at the Live Aid concert – the first live performance of the "Ant/Marco/Wiczling/De Niro" band – but was asked to cut his set to one song, for which he chose his new single, the Vive le Rock title track Ant later claimed to regret playing the fundraiser, saying, "I was asked by Sir Bob to promote this concert. They had no idea they could sell it out. Then in Bob's book, he said, 'Adam was over the hill so I let him have one number.'... Doing that show was the biggest f**king mistake in the world. Knighthoods were made, Bono got it made, and it was a waste of f**king time. It was the end of rock 'n' roll."

A year after the hit single success of "Apollo 9", which reached No. 13 in September 1984, the parent album Vive Le Rock was released in September 1985, to mixed reviews. As part of the promotion, the band performed a live TV session for Channel 4 music show Bliss hosted by Muriel Gray.  Several songs were recorded, although only two – "Miss Thing" from the new album and "Killer in the Home" from Kings of the Wild Frontier – were actually transmitted.

Ant paused his career in music at the end of 1985 to focus on his acting career. The Fort Lauderdale show was Ant's last full-length concert until February 1993. Indeed, between December 1982 and February 1995, Ant's only public live concerts outside North America were the four aforementioned UK/Spanish shows, Live Aid, a 1987 fanclub party performance, and a September 1994 EMI corporate event in Brighton. He severed ties with CBS in late 1986, following the release of the Hits audio/VHS compilation. In 1990, Ant returned with Manners & Physique, a collaboration with André Cymone, a solo artist and an early member of Prince's band. The album was another moderate success, and featured the single "Room at the Top", which was a Top 20 hit on both sides of the Atlantic. "Rough Stuff" became the second single for the United States and Germany as "Can't Set Rules About Love" charted in the United Kingdom.

In  1992, Nine Inch Nails released a cover of Adam & the Ants' "Physical (You're So)" on their Broken EP, originally released on the Kings of the Wild Frontier LP." Subsequently in 1995, Adam Ant performed "Physical" live with Nine Inch Nails on their tour for two nights in a row.

In 1995, Ant released the album, Wonderful. The title track was a successful single, as was a tour of the US in support of the album. While Ant and his group, which retained longtime guitarist Pirroni alongside Kris Dollimore (The Godfathers, The Damned), Bruce Whitkin, Dave Ruffy (The Ruts) and Dave Barbarossa (Adam and the Ants, Bow Wow Wow), played in smaller venues than they had played in the 1980s, the houses were often packed with enthusiastic fans. The tour was cut short due to Ant and Pirroni both contracting glandular fever. Ant also played three shows at Shepherd's Bush Empire in London and did a mini tour of Virgin Record Shops playing selected tunes from the album Wonderful and signing records. Adam and his band also played shows in Dublin, Glasgow, Middlesbrough and Stoke-on-Trent.

In 1996, Ant and Pirroni recorded two new songs, "Lamé" and "Inseminator", for the soundtrack to Ant's latest film Drop Dead Rock. Also around this time, they recorded a cover version of the T. Rex song "Dandy in the Underworld". The duo continued to demo other songs around this time, including such titles as "Tough Blokes", "Justine", "Picasso Meets Gary Cooper" and "Call Me Sausage" (the last of which leaked out into bootleg circulation among fans). These new songs with Pirroni were for Ant's own new label Blend Records. Pirroni later referred to these recordings as the Blend Demos. They also guested with such bands as Dweeb and Rachel Stamp. In 2001, following the 11 September attacks, Ant recorded a charity single for New York firefighters; a double A-side of Neil Diamond's "America" with his own song "Big Trouble". In interviews from the time, Ant talked of numerous varied plans, including starting another new record label, reforming Adam and the Ants, and a star-studded benefit concert for a forest in Patagonia.

2002–2009: Autobiography
In 2003, the Channel 4 television special titled The Madness of Prince Charmingwas aired in the UK documenting Ant's career and his struggle with mental illness (he was diagnosed as suffering with bipolar disorder).

In 2003, Ant and Wonderful collaborator, Boz Boorer, teamed with the Dian Fossey Gorilla Fund (now called The Gorilla Organisation) in a reworking of "Stand and Deliver" as "Save the Gorillas" as an EP along with four primate/rainforest-themed covers. Originally intended as a benefit record for the endangered mountain gorilla, it was never released, due to copyright and licensing issues relating to the title track. One track from the EP, Jungle Rock, was eventually released on Boorer's 2008 solo LP Miss Pearl.

Ant made a guest appearance on an EP released in 2005—Mike's Bikes by former Ants bassist Kevin Mooney's new band, the Lavender Pill Mob, on Mooney's own label Le Coq Musique. Ant provided lead vocals for Black Pirates, a reworking of the song Chicken Outlaw by Mooney's earlier band Wide Boy Awake, inspired by Mooney's departure from the Ants.

In September 2006, he published his autobiography, Stand & Deliver. Marking the release of the book, Ant did a UK book signing, which went from London to Edinburgh. After the success of the first edition the paperback edition was published in September 2007, which contains a new epilogue that covers the year following the initial hardback release.  As part of the promotion of the paperback, Ant performed a reading of selected passages of the book along with acoustic songs (accompanised by childhood friend Dave Pash on guitar) at the Bloomsbury Theatre, London on 24 September.  A live CD of highlights of the gig was released the following year.

2010–2012: Independent label and return to touring

On 4 March 2010, Adam Ant registered his new label Blue Black Hussar Ltd. as a private limited company at Companies House. That month also marked a return to live music. Ant's first live performance since The Bloomsbury in 2007 was at "Through The Looking Glass" bookshop in London on 18 March, at which he played "Ants Invasion", "Cartrouble", "Physical", and a cover of Iggy Pop's "The Passenger". A day later, on 19 March, Ant guested at a Zodiac Mindwarp and the Love Reaction gig at the Pipeline Bar, London E1, in which he provided lead vocals for the band's Top 20 hit "Prime Mover".
Ant performed yet another low key show at the Southwark Playhouse on Saturday 20 March.
During the intervals Ant talked about Sony records, how he rejected an alleged £2.6 million O2 deal, and a new album collaboration with Chris McCormack.

Ant played a sold-out headline concert, dubbed "The Pirate Metal Extravaganza" at the Scala in London on 30 April. He also performed some smaller guerilla gigs in Autumn 2010, which received no advance billing, including a solo show at the Dark Mills festival at London's Colour House Theatre on 4 September 2010, the launch party of the Illamasqua store on 16 September (at which Boy George served as DJ), and a guest spot at the Monster Raving Loony Party's annual conference in Fleet, Hampshire, on 25 September. On Thursday 21 October, Ant performed at the Union Chapel, London.

Ant headlined at the Scala again on 18 November, joined by a trio of female backing singers. The gig received positive reviews and three days later again topped the bill at a tribute concert for former Ant Matthew Ashman on 21 November at the same venue, in a show also featuring later Ashman bands Bow Wow Wow, Chiefs of Relief, Agent Provocateur and London rock act Slam Cartel. Ant was back playing live two days later on 23 December, when he and Baillee guested onstage at the Christmas party of West Rocks at Shepherds Bar in Shepherd's Bush and played live again at Proud, Camden on 5 January 2011 and at Madame Jojo's in Soho on 17 January. He finished the month by playing further dates of his "... WORLD TOUR OF LONDON ..."  with a two-night stand at the 100 Club on 26 and 27 January 2011.

Ant spent time in Paris where he played low-key shows (his first gigs outside the UK in nearly 16 years.). On 29 March 2011, BBC Radio 4 transmitted an interview of Ant by John Humphrys for the On the Ropes series in which Ant discussed his bipolar condition and its impact on his career. That same day, Ant held a press conference and media preview gig at Under The Bridge in Chelsea at which he formally unveiled plans for an eleven date UK concert tour (as with the Paris concert, the first such event in 16 years) due to run from 16 May to 4 June 2011. Also announced at the Chelsea event was a public screening of the December 1981 Prince Charming Revue concert video plus a question-and-answer session to be held in South London's Coronet Cinema on 11 May 2011. By the time the tour got underway on 16 May in Brighton, the original eleven date itinerary had been expanded to fifteen dates.  Ant completed the schedule of tour dates which were overwhelmingly enthusiastically received.

There was only one serious negative onstage incident, at Fat Sam's in Dundee on 21 May 2011 when Ant reacted angrily to some crowd elements who booed his kilt decorated with the St George's Cross. The tour closed in Manchester on 5 June with a show at the city's Manchester Academy.

 The Seaside Tour follow-up to the main UK tour and a warm-up to Ant's appearance at Hard Rock Calling 2011 in Hyde Park, London, on 26 June 2011, third on the bill to Rod Stewart and Stevie Nicks before an audience of 45,000. Ant later slotted in some more solo gigs, including the Soho Festival in London's Wardour Street on 11 July. Ant also announced a follow-up UK tour (described as the "second leg" of the 2011 tour), initially scheduled to run for twelve dates from 11 November 2011 in Bristol until 13 December 2011 in Newcastle. As with the previous leg, Ant passed the time until the tour playing one-off dates, appearing with his tour band in Bedford on 10 September before three days later reuniting with 2010 band members Crewdson and Love for a charity show on board . As with the previous tour, the itinerary was expanded from the initial 12 dates to an eventual 21 dates running from 10 November in Frome until 16 December in Norwich, (with a non-tour acoustic gig at a benefit event for London's Wilton Hall venue thrown in for good measure). Just three days after the final Norwich date of the tour, Ant was back onstage again with two members of his live band on 19 December at a charity event at Ronnie Scott's. The first record release of Ant's 2010s comeback also occurred at this point, with the release of the Sex Drugs and HIV compilation album featuring Ant's version of "Get A Grip" which had been recorded a year earlier while the World Tour of London was in progress.

A few days before the end of the second leg of his UK tour, it was officially announced that Ant would make his return to the US with a 15-date North American tour in February 2012, starting on 2 February in Ant's former adopted hometown of Los Angeles and running until 25 February in nearby Anaheim. A few days into the new year, however, it was announced that the tour was postponed until the Autumn. A five-date warm-up UK mini tour for Ant and his band nonetheless went ahead for 19–24 January 2012.

An exhibition of photographs of Ant – titled Adam Ant – Dandy in the Underworld ran from 7 March 2012 to 29 April 2012 at Proud Camden in London, featuring images of Ant throughout his career, including the work of Chris Duffy, Gerard McNamara, Jill Furmanovsky, Denis O'Regan, Chris Cuffaro, Hannah Domagala, Robert Matheu, David Corio and Janette Beckman.  To promote this exhibition, Ant performed a solo charity concert at the gallery on 6 March with the same two band members as the Ronnie Scotts concert from the previous December.  The concert was well received, although an inebriated Chrissie Hynde who was in attendance, heckled throughout the performance. While this exhibition was on, Ant took his band on tour to Australia with an initial five date schedule spread over a two-week period from 23 March to 8 April, taking in Sydney, Perth, Melbourne, Adelaide and Brisbane. In mid February, Ant made a warm-up visit to Australia, including an appearance on the Adam Hills in Gordon Street Tonight show recorded on 13 February 2012 for transmission on 15 February and promotional work in Melbourne and Sydney.

Although poor ticket sales forced the cancellation of the Adelaide gig, the remaining four concerts all went ahead.  The Sydney Morning Herald gave a reservedly positive review of the opening Sydney date on 23 March (which it rated three stars out of five), noting "In a set plus two encores (the first cheered for; the second not really but played anyway) comprising 30 songs, it was kind of the equivalent of throwing a lot of make-up at the mirror and seeing what stuck." Ant also made further Australian TV appearances including a return to Adam Hills in Gordon Street Tonight recorded on 26 March for transmission on 28 March, including live performances of "Stand and Deliver" and new album track "Vince Taylor" with his full band.

Subsequently, for the second year running, Ant was scheduled to make appearances on the summer festival circuit, interspersed with various one-off dates around the UK.  This got off to an early start when Ant stepped in as replacement headliner at the Bearded Theory festival in Derby on 18 May 2012, when the Levellers had to pull out due to one of the band members being injured. Ant also played the first full band concert in continental Europe of his 2010s comeback on 24 June 2012 at the Parkpop festival in the Zuiderpark in the Hague, Netherlands, with his set broadcast on Dutch national TV.  After six assorted dates around the UK in early July, Ant's next major show was a headline slot at the Silverstone Classic Festival on 21 July followed the next day by an appearance at Rewind in Perth and then at Camp Bestival on 27 July 2012. The rest of the summer saw Ant mix festivals such as the Summer Sundae Weekender on 18 August, Solfest on 24 August and the Isle of Wight Bestival with dates in such locations as Swindon, Southend-on-Sea, Warrington and Croydon. Later in the year, Ant's postponed US tour finally went ahead, commencing 13 September in Los Angeles and finishing on 20 October in nearby Anaheim.  The third UK tour of the 2010s, the Blueblack Hussar Tour, commenced on 1 November in Glasgow and ran to 30 November at London's Shepherd's Bush Empire. During the tour, the first single of the new album was released – "Cool Zombie", with the formerly planned A-side "Gun in Your Pocket" now as the B-side.  On New Year's Eve 2012, Ant and his full band appeared on Jools Holland's Hootenanny New Year music show, performing new album track "Vince Taylor" as well as old hits "Stand And Deliver" and "Antmusic".

2013–present: Release of new album, touring

The album, the focal point of the comeback since 2010, finally received its release on 21 January 2013. Its gestation had a long history which had been running alongside the live comeback; in 2009, it was announced that Ant was planning on putting a new record out. He also expressed interest in working with The Kaiser Chiefs.

In an April 2010 interview for the NME, Ant announced he was also working on a new album, with the title Adam Ant Is the Blueblack Hussar in Marrying the Gunner's Daughter. This featured collaborations with former 3 Colours Red guitarist Chris McCormack, Ant's long-time songwriting partner Marco Pirroni,  Morrissey's writing partner Boz Boorer and was also due to feature a member of Oasis (later identified as Andy Bell). According to Ant, the album is a "live record that lends itself to performance" and will feature a "kind of concept. It's a very old-fashioned, old-school, step-by-step album".  He also described the album as "very autobiographical, very personal." In addition, Ant re-recorded a song in tribute to the late Sex Pistols manager Malcolm McLaren, who died earlier that month, and who also once managed Adam & The Ants. Named Who's A Goofy Bunny Then?, the track was only previously available as a demo recorded in the early 1980s, but Ant stated he wanted to release a new version in tribute to the late punk manager. "Malcolm was a sort of mentor in my life", he said. "As close as you can get to a surrogate father". The song took its name from a term of endearment bestowed upon McLaren by Ant – referring to his "quite prominent teeth".

On 31 December 2010, Ant gave an interview for The Sun (featured in the "Something for the Weekend" segment) in which he discussed in considerable detail the various controversies surrounding his recent life and musical activities. He summed up his upcoming album thus: "The Blueblack Hussar is me coming back to life. I'm like The Terminator —- I was a dead man walking". He also discussed individual songs on the album — as well as "Gun in Your Pocket" (which, aside from the Troubador live performance, had also been given a club dancefloor play by Ant himself as guest DJ at the Family Affair clubnight in Shoreditch, London on 24 April 2010), The interview in The Sun also made mention of "Shrink", a song about Ant's experiences in the mental healthcare system. Ant had previously discussed both of these songs in his April 2010 interview with Simon Price for online fanzine The Quietus. On his second visit to Iain Lee's show on Absolute Radio on 4 January 2011, two further new tracks were debuted, "Hard Men, Tough Blokes" and "punkyoungirl" . In an interview for Bizarre magazine published that month, Ant named the song co-written with Andy Bell as "Cool Zombie".

21 January 2013 release date was officially announced by Ant onstage at his September 2012 concert in Chatham by Ant's own record label Blueblack Hussar Records. Despite the decidedly DIY nature of the release, the album reached number 25 on the UK Albums Chart, only one place lower than its predecessor had managed when released on the corporate EMI label nearly eighteen years earlier. It had previously been at number 8 in the Midweeks. To promote the album, Ant performed a series of concerts around the British Isles during April and May (billed as a "Spring Tour") culminating in a gig at The Roundhouse on 11 May. A free concert in Rome took place on 14 June and a second full length 40 plus show US tour got underway on 17 July in San Diego and ran to 21 September in Anaheim. Prior to the tour, Ant and his band appeared on NBC's Late Night with Jimmy Fallon to promote the new album, performing a live version of the track "Vince Taylor".

During early 2014, Ant was at work recording his next album, titled Bravest of the Brave.  On 19 April, Ant performed his debut album Dirk Wears White Sox at the Hammersmith Apollo with a band including former Ants Dave Barbe and Lee Gorman, preceding this with several UK tour dates.  He also reissued the Dirk album on white vinyl on his Blueblack Hussar label, with a launch party gig at the 100 CLub.  Both London concerts were filmed and later released as the DVD album Dirk Live At The Apollo.  Ant subsequently performed the full album again with his regular band for four nights at the Islington Assembly Hall in November 2014 and a full UK tour in Spring 2015. Jack Bond's documentary on Ant, The Blueblack Hussar, covering his life and performances from late 2010 to mid 2011, was released on DVD in July 2014 by Sunrise Pictures.

Ant toured the UK in 2016 and North America in  early 2017, performing his Kings of the Wild Frontier album in its entirety. Sony Records issued a deluxe box set of the album linked to the UK leg of the tour, including a gold vinyl pressing of the album (as previously announced by Ant at the 100 Club gig in 2014).  After his January 24, 2017 show in Boston MA Ant's guitarist and music director, Tom Edwards, suddenly died due to suspected heart failure; he was 41. After cancelling shows in New York and Philadelphia, the tour continued. Later the same year, he toured the UK and announced he would return to North America with another tour, titled "Anthems: The Singles" in the autumn, and afterwards would be taking the Kings tour to  Australia and New Zealand.

Ant announced the Friend or Foe tour, which traveled North America and the United Kingdom from September to December 2019. He performed the album in its entirety in an 18-date tour in North America before returning to the United Kingdom for 26 shows. A further North American tour originally planned for April–May 2020 was shifted back to 2021 then 2022 as result of the COVID-19 pandemic. It was eventually scrapped due to the glut of rescheduled tours, but a 19 date "Antics" tour of the UK did go ahead.

In 2023, a US show was announced: Ant will be one of the headliners at the Cruel World Festival in Pasadena, California on May 20.

Musical style
The tone of Ant's debut solo album, Friend or Foe, was defined as glitzy glam pop with "tongue-in-cheek tunes, delivered with an excess of flair and good humour". It was also described as being "one of Ant's best records and one of the best new wave albums".

In a review for Strip, the songs were considered to contain a "mixture of driving, danceable rock with humour".

The music on Vive Le Rock has been said to be a "50s-style rock & roll sound".

The fourth studio album, Manners and Physique, was said to be a combination of "contemporary dance tracks" and Ant's "old flair for mockery". Ant himself later said that the album was styled after the bass heavy Minneapolis sound of which André Cymone, in Ant's words, was "one of the architects".

Discography

Adam and the Ants
 Dirk Wears White Sox (1979)
 Kings of the Wild Frontier (1980)
 Prince Charming (1981)

Adam Ant
 Friend or Foe (1982)
 Strip (1983)
 Vive Le Rock (1985)
 Manners & Physique (1990)
 Wonderful (1995)
 Adam Ant Is the Blueblack Hussar in Marrying the Gunner's Daughter (2013)

Concert tours
Headlining
 Young Parisians Tour, Great Britain, January–February 1979, 15 dates including London Electric Ballroom support slot for The Lurkers
 Zerox Tour, Great Britain, July–August 1979, 17 dates plus private preview show
 Ants Invasion Tour, Great Britain May–June 1980, 15 dates plus private preview show
 Kings of the Wild Frontier Tour, Great Britain, November–December 1980, 32 dates
 Stand And Deliver Tour, worldwide, March–October 1981, 54 dates (not including April 1981 London charity show)
 Individual legs:
 Stand And Deliver UK Tour, Great Britain, March 1981, six dates
 US Ants Invasion Tour, United States and Canada, April 1981, 13 dates
 Stand And Deliver European Tour, assorted Western European nations, May–June 1981, 19 dates
 Kings Of The Wild Frontier World Tour, United States, Japan and Australia, September–October 1981, 16 dates
 The Prince Charming Revue, Great Britain, December 1981 – January 1982, 25 dates at ten venues

 Friend or Foe Tour Great Britain: Six dates, October–November 1982.
 United States and Canada: 83 dates, November 1982 – May 1983.
 Strip Tour United States: 60 dates, January–April 1984.
 Vive Le Rock Tour Spain: 1 date August 1985.
 England: 3 dates (London, Manchester, Birmingham) September 1985.
 United States and Canada: 34 dates, October–November 1985.
 Persuasion Tour United States and Mexico: 28 dates including preview show, February–March 1993.
 Wonderful Tour United Kingdom and Republic of Ireland: 8 dates March 1995. 
 United States and Canada: 38 dates April–June 1995
 Wonderful Instore Acoustic TourUnited States: 2 dates March 1995. 
Great Britain, 10 shows in 5 days (2 shows per day) April 1995
 The Good, The Mad And The Lovely TourUnited Kingdom and Republic of Ireland:
First leg: 15 dates plus preview show May–June 2011.
"Seaside Tour": five dates June 2011.
Second leg: 22 dates November–December 2011 plus three warmup dates October 2011
Third leg: five dates, January 2012. 
 Australia: four dates March–April 2012
 United States: 20 dates September–October 2012
 Blueblack Hussar Tour United Kingdom,  Republic of Ireland, Channel Islands and Isle of Man:
 First leg: 19 dates November 2012
 Second leg: 12 dates April–May 2013
 Netherlands and Belgium: Three dates December 2012
 United States and Canada: 44 dates July–September 2013
 XII Before Dirk Tour Great Britain: five dates (reduced from scheduled titular 12) April 2014
 Dirk Wears White Sox Live Tour England: 12 dates April 2015
 Kings of the Wild Frontier Live Tour 
Great Britain: 14 dates May–June plus London Christmas show December 2016
United States and Canada 17 dates January–February 2017
Australia and New Zealand: six dates October 2017
 ANThems Tour Great Britain: 18 dates May 2017 plus London Christmas shows December 2017 (one date) and December 2018 (two dates).
 United States: 14 dates September 2017. Three postponed Florida dates rescheduled for January 2018.  Ten further dates July–August 2018
 Friend Or Foe Tour United States and Canada: 18 dates, September–October 2019
 Great Britain: 26 dates, November–December 2019
 United States: 16 dates, April–May 2020 – postponed to 2022 due to COVID-19, cancelled due to schedule conflicts
 Antics Tour Great Britain: 19 dates June–September 2022 - postponed from February–March 2022

In addition to the above, seven London concert dates between October 2010 and January 2011 were promoted as the World Tour of London.
Also, seven dates in April 1978, four in London and one each in Nottingham, Liverpool and Sheffield were advertised on a handbill as being the "Dirk Wears White Socks Tour"

Residency
Marquee Club, London, England
5–26 January 1978 (four successive Thursdays)

Acting career
Ant's acting career began in 1977 when he appeared in Jubilee. During the 1980s and 1990s he was living in Hollywood and pursued his acting career, taking roles in films such as Nomads, Slam Dance, Sunset Heat, and Love Bites. Ant also appeared on American television shows, including The Equalizer, Sledge Hammer!, Tales from the Crypt and Northern Exposure in which he played a rock musician. 

Ant has also worked in theatre: he starred in Joe Orton's Entertaining Mr. Sloane and appeared in Funeral Games.: 257, 326 He produced the musical Be Bop A Lula about rock 'n' roll singers Gene Vincent and Eddie Cochran's days on tour in England, with a set designed by L.A. artist Michael Pearce. 

TV and film

Theatre

Literature
 

Awards and nominations

Personal life
Ant married Carol Mills in 1975 — when they were both still students at Hornsey College of Art:92 — and they divorced in 1982. He dated Amanda Donohoe between 1977 and 1981, Jamie Lee Curtis in 1983 and Heather Graham in the early 1990s. He featured a song about Vanity of Vanity 6, the female vocal group associated with Prince, on the Strip album. In 1997, Ant married Lorraine Gibson, a 25-year-old PR assistant for Vivienne Westwood. The ceremony took place in Dayton, Tennessee. They divided their time between Dayton and London, and on April 10, 1998, the couple had a daughter, Lily Caitlin Goddard. The couple divorced four years later, by 2002.

Ant, who does not own a television, enjoys reading, particularly historical novels. He has tattoos depicting Lord Nelson's last prayer before the Battle of Trafalgar, an image of his grandfather and a quotation from Oscar Wilde: "Experience is the name everyone gives to their mistakes."

Mental health Issues
Ant has spoken candidly about his mental health issues and experiences with the effects of the illness. In 1975, when he was living with his first wife at her parents' home in Muswell Hill, he suffered from depression and developed anorexia. "I just didn't eat," he has said of this period, "I wasn't attempting to slim, I was attempting to kill myself." He took an overdose of pills and, after having his stomach pumped, was sent to Colney Hatch psychiatric hospital in North London; he was diagnosed as having bipolar disorder and discharged after three months. "I was totally fucked-up in the head. Things went wrong and something snapped. I just became a vegetable for three months. I couldn't talk to people. I was very ill and that was part of the reason I left college." 

In 2002, Ant was poised to join the 1980s-focused Here & Now tour, but was unable to do so after he was arrested and charged with throwing a car alternator through a window at the Prince of Wales pub in Camden and then threatening patrons with a starting pistol. Ant's court trial was held later that year at the Old Bailey in London. The charges against him, which included criminal damage and threatening members of the public, were reduced to a single count of causing affray, to which he pleaded guilty. He was fined £500 and placed under a 12-month Community Rehabilitation Order for psychiatric care, with a suspended sentence. In June 2003, it was reported that Ant had been arrested again on suspicion of criminal damage, before it was decided that he should be hospitalised for treatment. 

On 18 May 2010, Ant was returned to psychiatric hospital, where he remained until mid-June, subsequently returning home under outpatient supervision. In his 31 December 2010 interview for The Sun'', Ant discussed the side effects of medication for his bipolar condition: "In the past I've been a robot. It's been an out-of-body experience. Bipolar means up and down and that's me... Music has always been the best medication. I was on sodium valproate for seven years.... I couldn't get to sleep and I didn't make love for seven years. My hair fell out and I couldn't pick up a book as I couldn't concentrate. I didn't write a song or pick up a guitar in that time – and piled on the weight. I might as well have been dead. I work very closely with my GP and any decisions I make are made with him". During an interview with BBC Radio 6 Music, he declared that "mental health needs a great deal of attention. It's the final taboo and it needs to be faced and dealt with." Ant is involved in the Black Dog campaign, which promotes better understanding of mental illness.

References

External links

 Official website
 
 

1954 births
Adam and the Ants members
Alumni of Middlesex University
English male singers
English new wave musicians
English rock singers
English male actors
English Romani people
Ivor Novello Award winners
CBS Records artists
Living people
Male new wave singers
People educated at St Marylebone Grammar School
People from Marylebone
People from Muswell Hill
People with bipolar disorder
Bazooka Joe (band) members
Romani musicians
Romani singers
Romani actors